NGC 354 is a barred spiral galaxy in the constellation Pisces. It was discovered on October 24, 1881 by Édouard Stephan. It was described by Dreyer as "very faint, very small, round, very small (faint) star involved, 14th magnitude star close to west."

References

External links
 

0354
18811024
Pisces (constellation)
Barred spiral galaxies
003763